Gary Samuel Cuozzo (born April 26, 1941) is a former professional American football player.

High school career
Cuozzo played high school football at Glen Ridge High School in Glen Ridge, New Jersey.

Football career
An undrafted quarterback from the University of Virginia, Cuozzo played in 10 NFL seasons from 1963 to 1972.  He began his NFL career on the Baltimore Colts as a backup to Johnny Unitas. When Unitas was injured in 1965, Cuozzo replaced him and in his first start set a new NFL record for most touchdown passes in one game. After he was sidelined by injury as well coach Don Shula resorted to using running back Tom Matte as quarterback.

On March 6, 1967, the Colts traded Cuozzo to the expansion New Orleans Saints, as part of a deal that also sent offensive lineman Butch Allison to the Saints in exchange for a 1967 first round draft pick (#1-Bubba Smith), a 1967 third round pick (#54-Norman Davis), a 1969 seventh round pick (#163-Gary Fleming) and center Bill Curry. He became the first starting quarterback in the franchise's history. However, the trade was disastrous for New Orleans, which gave away the first overall pick in the 1967 NFL draft to the Colts, who used it to select Michigan State All-American Bubba Smith, who became an All-Pro and was Baltimore's starting left defensive end in Super Bowl III and V.

After losing the Saints' starting job later in 1967 to Billy Kilmer, Cuozzo was traded to the Minnesota Vikings in January 1968. He became the Vikings' starting quarterback in 1970 when Joe Kapp, the team's Most Valuable Player in 1969, held out and was traded to the Boston Patriots. Cuozzo was named NFC Player of the Week for leading the Vikings to a 27–10 victory over the Kansas City Chiefs in a rematch of Super Bowl IV in the season opener.

The 1970 Vikings posted the NFL's best regular season record at 12–2, but lost in an NFC Divisional playoff game to the San Francisco 49ers at home. In 1971, Cuozzo could not hold on to his starting job, sharing duties with Norm Snead and Bob Lee. The Vikings went 11–3 in the regular season and lost in the divisional playoffs at home to the eventual Super Bowl champion Dallas Cowboys. Prior to  the 1972 season, the Vikings reacquired Fran Tarkenton from the New York Giants, with Snead and the Vikings' leading receiver from 1971, Bob Grim, going to the Big Apple. Tarkenton played his first six seasons (1961–66) in Minnesota, coinciding with the Vikings' first six seasons in the NFL.

Cuozzo was traded to the St. Louis Cardinals in the deal which sent fleet wide receiver John Gilliam to the Vikings. Cardinals coach Bob Hollway was familiar with Cuozzo, having served as Minnesota's defensive coordinator under Bud Grant prior to leaving for St. Louis in 1971.  Cuozzo was part of a chaotic four-quarterback rotation with Jim Hart, Pete Beathard, and Tim Van Galder in 1972, but when Don Coryell took over as Cardinals coach in 1973, he named Hart the undisputed starter, and he would hold the job into the 1980s.

After football
Following his retirement in 1973, Cuozzo moved to Middletown Township, New Jersey, to start an orthodontics practice.

In 1990, his oldest son Gary Jr., a/k/a Chip, was murdered in Miami during a drug deal, and Cuozzo gave talks to teens about avoiding drugs.  He served as national chairman of the Fellowship of Christian Athletes from 1995 to 1998.

References

External links
 Klingaman, Mike. "Catching Up With...former Colt Gary Cuozzo," The Baltimore Sun, Tuesday, September 29, 2009.
 

1941 births
Living people
Baltimore Colts players
Minnesota Vikings players
American football quarterbacks
Glen Ridge High School alumni
New Orleans Saints players
People from Glen Ridge, New Jersey
People from Middletown Township, New Jersey
People from Montclair, New Jersey
Players of American football from New Jersey
Sportspeople from Essex County, New Jersey
St. Louis Cardinals (football) players
University of Virginia alumni
Virginia Cavaliers football players